St Edmund Hall (sometimes known as The Hall or informally as Teddy Hall) is a constituent college of the University of Oxford. The college claims to be "the oldest surviving academic society to house and educate undergraduates in any university" and was the last surviving medieval academic hall at the university.

The college is on Queen's Lane and the High Street, in central Oxford. After more than seven centuries as a men-only college, it became coeducational in 1979. As of 2019, the college had a financial endowment of more than £65 million.

Alumni of St Edmund Hall include diplomats Robert Macaire and Mark Sedwill, and politicians Richard Onslow, 1st Baron Onslow,  Keir Starmer and Mel Stride. The elected Honorary Fellows: Faith Wainwright, MBE FREng (1980, Engineering) and the Hon Justice Elizabeth Hollingworth(1984, BCL).

History

Similar to the University of Oxford itself, the precise date of establishment of St Edmund Hall is not certain; it is usually estimated at 1236, before any other college was formally established, though the founder from whom the Hall takes its name, St Edmund of Abingdon, Oxfordshire, the first known Oxford Master of Arts and the first Oxford-educated Archbishop of Canterbury, lived and taught on the college site as early as the 1190s. The name St Edmund Hall (Aula Sancti Edmundi) first appears in a 1317 rental agreement.
Before that, the house appeared as the ‘house of Cowley’ in rental agreements with the abbey. Thomas of Malsbury, the Vicar of Cowley, partially conveyed the site and its buildings to the abbey in 1270-71, having purchased it for eight pounds nine years prior. Cowley fully conveyed the property to the abbey in 1289-90 with an annuity of 'thirteen shillings and fourpence', 13s.4d. or 13⧸4 (read as 'thirteen and four', i.e. one 'mark', a notional value being worth precisely two-thirds of a ₤ Stg) paid to himself and eight shillings for his niece. 
During the thirteenth century, the university encouraged masters of the arts to rent properties to take in scholars as their tenants. The university preferred such arrangements over private lodgings, which it linked to loose living, poor discipline, public disorder and fighting. Moreover, university-approved accommodation run by approved principals, gave the university more oversight. Principals leased the halls annually and had to present themselves in front of the university's chancellor in St Mary's church yearly and guarantee that their hall would pay its rent. Halls whose principals undertook this formality earned recognition as academic halls.
John de Cornuba leased the Hall from Osney Abbey, a large Augustinian institution in the neighbouring town of Osney, for thirty-five shillings (i.e. ₤1-15-0 or exactly one and three-quarters of a ₤ Stg) annually.
The Abbey's rent collections varied from fifteen shillings (i.e. 3 crowns or more commonly spoken as three-quarters of a ₤ Stg) for small institutions to four pounds for larger institutions. Judging by the Hall's annual rent sum, St Edmund's was a small to medium-sized academic hall at the time. However, by 1324-5 Osney Abbey had raised the Hall's rent to forty-six shillings and eight pence (i.e. ₤2-6-8, two pounds and a 'noble' where the notional value of 6 shillings and eightpence is equal to precisely one-third of a ₤ Stg) while rents for other student hall's in the city had fallen. The rent increase indicates that the site expanded after 1318. Letters sent to Oseney showed that the abbey gained two additional plots of land and buildings adjacent to the Hall and leased it to St Edmund Hall. The acquisition increased the Hall's capacity and also gave it access to the well which forms the centrepiece of the quadrangle. 

St Edmund Hall began as one of Oxford's ancient Aularian houses, the medieval halls that laid the University's foundation, preceding the creation of the first colleges. As the only surviving medieval hall, its members are known as Aularians.

Lollardism

The college has a history of independent thought, which brought it into frequent conflict with both Church and State. During the late 14th and early 15th centuries, it was a bastion of John Wycliffe's supporters, pejoratively referred to as Lollards. This group of reformists challenged Papal supremacy, condemning practices such as Clerical celibacy, offerings to effigies, confession, and pilgrimage. They also believed that transubstantiation was tantamount to necromancy and felt that the Church's pursuit of arts and crafts was wasteful. However, it was their early Bible translations and belief that everyone should have access to scriptures which they were primarily known for. Ultimately, Lollardism would assimilate with Protestantism in the 1500s culminating in King Henry VIII's English Reformation.

William Taylor

The Hall's reformist activities caught the attention of Archbishop Thomas Arundel who opposed Lollardism. Arundel witnessed a sermon given by Principal William Taylor at St Paul's Cross in 1406 or 1407 and summoned him. However, Taylor failed to appear and was subsequently excommunicated for contumacy. Following his excommunication, Taylor embarked on a career as a Lollard preacher. 
Taylor continued to preach whilst excommunicated. In 1419/20 Archbishop Chichele absolved Taylor after he confessed to preaching whilst excommunicated. However, he was arrested soon thereafter for espousing unorthodox opinions in Bristol's Holy Trinity Church. 
Subsequently, Taylor was declared a relapsed heretic, handed over to the secular courts and burnt at the stake.

Peter Payne

Taylor's successor Peter Payne, also a Lollard, continued supporting Wyclif's opinions. It is believed that Payne was partly switched on to Lolladism by John Purvey, one of Wycliffe's original supporters. Purvey advocated for vernacular translations of the Bible, and compelled Payne to defend Wycliffs translations of the scriptures. Payne drew hostility from Oxford's Friars after allegedly purloining the University's common seal and using it to seal a letter sent to the ecclesiastical reformer Jan Hus in Prague. His letter claimed that Oxford and all of England barring the Friars shared the same views that Hus's supporters (the Hussites) shared in Prague. The letter also commended Wyclif's life and teachings and because he sealed it with the University's seal the Hussites accepted it as genuine. 
 
Arundel deemed the college's activities dangerous enough to warrant an intervention and suppression. Arundel began by banning Oxford's schools from using Wycliffe's texts unless approved by a committee and ordered that all of Oxford's principals make monthly inquiries to make sure their scholars' views were orthodox. Next, he ordered each committee to go through Wyclif's writings and draw up a list of errors and heresys which he presented to the King. The King wrote to the university ordering that anyone holding reformist opinions be placed in prison. 
Peter Payne fled the country left Oxford in 1412. Little is known of Payne after his time at St Edmund's but it is believed he died in Prague as a veteran Hussite.

Seventeenth century onwards
In the late 17th and 18th centuries, St Edmund Hall incurred the wrath of the Crown for fostering non-jurors, men who remained loyal to the Jacobite succession of the House of Stuart and who refused to take the oath to their successors after 1688, whom they regarded as having usurped the British throne.

In 1877, Prime Minister Benjamin Disraeli appointed commissioners to consider and implement reform of the university and its colleges and halls. The commissioners concluded that the four remaining medieval halls were not viable and should merge with colleges on the death or resignation of the incumbent principals.  In 1881, the commissioners issued University Statutes which provided for a partial merger of St Edmund with Queen's and for the other halls to merge with colleges. 

In 1903, only St Edmund Hall remained. Principal Edward Moore wished to retire and become a resident canon in Canterbury Cathedral. Queen's College proposed an amended statute for complete rather than partial merger, which was rejected by the Congregation. In 1912 a statute was passed preserving the independence of the hall, which enabled Moore to retire. Queen Elizabeth II approved St Edmund Hall's charter of incorporation as a full college of the University of Oxford in 1957, although it deliberately retained its ancient title of "Hall". The Duke of Edinburgh presented the royal charter to the college in June 1958.

In 1978, women were first admitted as members of the Hall, with the first matriculations of women in 1979. In 2015, the college celebrated the matriculation of its 3000th female student with events and exhibitions, including the display of portraits of notable women who had taught, studied or worked at the Hall in the Dining Hall, a noticeable change from the styles of portraits in most colleges. Between 2015 and 2017, the proportion of UK undergraduates admitted to St Edmund Hall who were women was 42.3%.

Buildings and grounds
St Edmund Hall is located in central Oxford, on the north side of the High Street, off Queen's Lane. It borders New College to the North and the Carrodus Quad of The Queen's College to the south. The front quadrangle houses the porters' lodge, the Old Dining Hall, built in the 1650s, the college bar (the buttery), the chapel, the Old Library, offices and accommodation for students and Fellows.

Entrance

An engraving of the college coat of arms is found above the entrance to the college on Queen's Lane. As seen in this image, the coat of arms sits above the following Latin dedication "sanctus edmundus huius aulae lux", or "St Edmund, light of this Hall".

It is a very common practice within the University to use chronograms for dedications. When transcribed into Latin, they are written in such a way that an important date, usually that of a foundation or the dedication itself, is embedded in the text in Roman numerals.

In the above dedication, the text is rendered as

sanCtVs edMVndVs hVIVs aVLae LVX

and, in this case, adding the numerals gives:

C + V + M + V + V + V + I + V + V + L + L + V + X = 1246

(For this reading one must disregard the usual "subtractive" convention — according to which, for example, "IV" would be 4, not 6.) The year 1246 is the date of the canonisation of St Edmund of Abingdon.

Well

In the centre of the quadrangle is a medieval well, which was uncovered in 1926 during the construction of a new lecture room and accommodation. This well is believed to be the original from which St Edmund himself drew water. A new wellhead was added, with the inscription "haurietis aquas in gaudio de fontibus salvatoris", Latin for "with joy, draw water from the wells of salvation". These words, from Isaiah 12:3, are believed to be those spoken by St Edmund on his deathbed at Salisbury. A metal grate was added to the well to prevent injuries, but water can still be seen in the well at a depth of about 9 feet. Plans to add a wooden frame and bucket were scrapped to maintain the overall appearance of the quad.

Chapel
The east side of the Front Quad contains the chapel. The chapel contains a stained glass window which is one of the earliest works by the artists Sir Edward Burne-Jones and William Morris, and a painting above the altar named Supper at Emmaus, by Ceri Richards. Often described as a 'marmite painting' due to its anachronous style within the chapel, which dates to the late 17th century, the painting commemorates the granting of the college's Royal Charter. The organ was built by Wood of Huddersfield in the 1980s. The St Edmund Hall Chapel Choir consists of eight choral scholars, two organ scholars and many other non-auditioning singers. The choir goes on two annual tours, including trips to Wells Cathedral in 2017, Pontigny, France, the burial place of St Edmund, in 2016 and Warsaw, Poland in 2015.

Old Library
Above the chapel is the Old Library. It was the last among Oxford colleges to chain its valuable books, but the first to have shelves against the walls. The Old Library is no longer the main library of the Hall, but is used for events and for research.

Library

The college library, the deconsecrated 12th-century church of St Peter-in-the-East, was converted in the 1970s, and includes the 14th century tower, which houses a tutor's room at the top. The oldest part of the library still standing is the crypt below the church, which dates from the 1130s. The library is situated in the original churchyard of St Peter-in-the-East. 40,000 volumes are housed within it to cater to the wide variety of courses offered at the Hall. While many of the graves have had their contents disinterred, several gravestones remain including one belonging to James Sadler, the first English aeronaut, and another which states the occupant died upon February 31. The garden contains a seated bronze sculpture of St Edmund as an impoverished student.

Modern buildings
In 1934, the Oxford-based architect Fielding Dodd completed the south side of the college's quadrangle, marking the 700th anniversary of St Edmund's consecration as the Archbishop of Canterbury. In 1965–9, Kenneth Stevens and Partners, inheritors of Dodd's architectural practice, worked on a large programme of new building at the college, including a new dining hall, common rooms, teaching facilities, and undergraduate accommodation. These are at the rear of the main site in the Kelly, Emden, Besse, and Whitehall buildings. All first-year undergraduate students are guaranteed accommodation on the main site and many return for their third year after living out, usually in East Oxford, for the duration of their second year. The Wolfson Hall, the 20th-century dining hall, seats approximately 230 people and is used by students on a daily basis for breakfast, lunch and dinner.

Annexes
The college also owns annexes at Norham Gardens, on Dawson Street and on Iffley Road.

The Norham Gardens annexe includes the Graduate Centre, a complex consisting of several large Victorian villas. This site was for many years the home of St Stephen's House, Oxford, before that institution moved to Iffley Road in 1980. The Norham Gardens annexe has the capacity to house most first-year graduate students and has its own common room, IT facilities, gardens and gym. In addition to student rooms, the Graduate Centre also has a quantity of faculty housing. The Dawson Street and Iffley Road annexes host undergraduates who do not live on the main site in pleasant en-suite, self-catering rooms.

Student life
As of 2017, the college has roughly 410 undergraduate, 300 graduate students and 75 Fellows, organised into three common rooms. The Junior Common Room (JCR), for undergraduates, and Middle Common Room (MCR), for postgraduates, both organise regular events, including a Freshers' week programme, dinners and film nights. The college is reputed for the strength of its 'Hall Spirit' with the semi-finals and finals of sports competitions regularly attended by in excess of 70 supporters.

Creative writing
The college has a weekly creative writing workshop, a termly poetry reading series, an online writers' forum and The St Edmund Hall Gallery, the annual student arts and literary magazine. 

The college runs an annual journalism competition for Oxford University students, in memory of alumnus and promising young journalist Philip Geddes, who died in the IRA bombing of Harrods in 1983. The college also hosts an annual lecture in his name.

Drama
St Edmund Hall has a lively drama society, the John Oldham Society, which worked in Cameroon in 2013 on a community drama project. In 2017-18 the College's entry into Drama Cuppers, the satirical 'Oswald French', written and starring Hugh Shepherd-Cross, reached the final round, and two students directed and produced a play called God of Carnage, which sold out its entire run at the Burton Taylor Studio. In 2019-20 the John Oldham Society staged a production of The Importance of Being Earnest. The production sold out and was very well received, with the profits being donated to Stonewall.

Music
The College has one of the largest non-auditioning College Choirs in Oxford, which is anchored by two Organ Scholars and eight Choral Scholars, under the direction of James Whitbourn, the Director of Music. The choir performs an evensong every Sunday and on special occasions, including the Feast Day of St Edmund and the popular 'Carols in the Quad' event at Christmas. The Choir take part in an annual exchange with Fitzwillam College, Cambridge, a UK residential (previous destinations have included Wells and Worcester Cathedrals), and visit Pontigny, France on tour each year to perform.

During Hilary term 2018 several events were held, including the Intercollegiate Evensong at the University Church; the joint service with the Hall's sister college, Fitzwilliam College, Cambridge; and the joint Ash Wednesday service with University College. The term ended with an exploration of Lenten music through Buxtehude's extraordinary cycle of cantatas: Membra Jesu Nostri. The Choir was joined by members of the world-class period instrument ensemble Instruments of Time & Truth for a powerful performance of the first three cantatas in the cycle.

Sport
St Edmund Hall participates in a large number of sports including rugby, football, rowing, tennis, cricket, mixed lacrosse, netball, hockey, swimming, and basketball, among others. Since becoming a college in 1957, the Men's Rugby Union team has won over half the Cuppers Tournaments it has ever entered (33 wins from 62 attempts). As a part of a team consisting of several colleges, Teddy Hall won women's rugby Cuppers in 2015–2016. In 2016–2017, St Edmund Hall won men's football and cricket Cuppers and its women's first boat and men's second boat won blades in Bumps. In 2017-2018 the College recorded victories in Men's Basketball (by 74-49 in the final), Swimming (for the third consecutive year), Men's Rugby, Women's Rugby (joint with Mansfield and Pembroke), Rounders (after an unbeaten season), and Pool. Men's Rugby was won 20-17 over St Peter's College. Cricket Cuppers was almost retained. Finals were also reached by the Men's 2nd XI, the Mixed Hockey team, the Tennis Club, and the 2nd VII went unbeaten in their netball league. Strong performances are also consistently recorded in men's and women's hockey, badminton and canoe polo.

The St Edmund Hall Boat Club held the men's headship in Summer Eights five times between 1959 and 1965 and women's headship from 2006 to 2009. SEHBC had success at the Henley Royal Regatta during its era of dominance in Oxford rowing in the 1960s.

 In 1958 an SEH coxless IV were the losing finalists in the Ladies' Challenge Plate, losing to Keble by 3 lengths.

 In 1959 a joint SEH/Lincoln College VIII won the Stewards' Challenge Cup, beating GS Moto Guzzi of Italy easily.

 In 1960 another joint SEH/Lincoln College VIII were the losing finalists in the Stewards' Challenge Cup, being beaten by Barn Cottage BC by 4 lengths.

 In 1961 an SEH coxless IV won the Visitors' Challenge Cup, beating St Catherine's College, Cambridge by 1½ lengths.

 In 1963 the 1st VIII were the losing finalists in the Ladies' Challenge Plate, losing to the Royal Military Academy Sandhurst by ½ length.

 In 1965, SEHBC had two victories; the 1st VIII won The Ladies' Challenge Plate, beating Jesus College, Cambridge by ¾ length, and an SEHBC coxless IV won the Visitors' Challenge Cup, beating Fitzwilliam House, Cambridge by 2 lengths.

The college celebrates the students’ successes in sports, arts and other extra-curricular activities at the annual Achievements Dinner. Cuppers winning teams are also rewarded with their photograph in the college bar, the walls of which are now crammed with teams dating from the late nineteenth century to the present day. The college also awards the Luddington Prize to undergraduate students who manage to achieve both a First Class degree in finals and a university Blue.

Outreach
The College has a very active outreach and access programme, employing two full-time staff and supported by a team of over 30 volunteer Student Ambassadors. Working with schools in the assigned link areas, including Leicestershire, Hampshire, the Isle of Wight and Peterborough, the College hosts visits from school groups and was one of the first colleges to take student ambassadors on an access roadshow. This saw four students and the Schools Liaison Officer visit nine schools in 4 days in Hampshire and the Isle of Wight in 2016 and continues to take place annually. The College since has expanded its provision to include a second roadshow in collaboration with Pembroke College, Cambridge, visiting schools and colleges in Leicestershire, which first took place in November 2018.

Formal Hall and college graces
The usual grace given before Formal Hall, as said by the fellow presiding at the dinner, is:

The post cibum grace, given following pudding, is a slight variant on the above:
To which the assembly responds Amen. More extended (or sung) forms of the grace are sometimes given but these are limited to special occasions, such as the Feast of St Edmund, a formal held each year to commemorate the namesake of the hall.

The traditional college toast is occasionally also said at dinners, and is simply "Floreat Aula", Latin for "May the Hall Flourish".

People associated with the college

Notable alumni

Other notable figures
 St Edmund of Abingdon
 Jeremy Paxman, a Fellow of the College by Special Election.

Principals
 1405–1406 William Taylor, theologian, priest, excommunicated and executed as a Lollard
 1410–1414 Peter Payne, theologian, diplomat, Lollard and Taborite
 1565– Thomas Lancaster, Protestant clergyman, Church of Ireland Archbishop of Armagh
 1610–1631 John Rawlinson, clergyman
 1658–1676 Thomas Tully
 1685–1707 John Mill, theologian
 1751–1760 George Fothergill
 1722–1740 Henry Felton, clergyman and academic
 1740–1751 Thomas Shaw
 1864–1903 Edward Moore
 1913–1920 Henry Williams, Bishop of Carlisle (1920–1946)
 1914–1918 Leonard Hodgson (Vice-Principal)
 1920–1928 G.B. Allen
 1928 George B. Cronshaw
 1929–1951 Alfred Brotherston Emden
 1951–1979 J.N.D. Kelly, clergyman
 1979–1982 Sir Ieuan Maddock
 1982–1996 J C B Gosling
 1996–1998 Sir Stephen Tumim
 1999–2009 Michael Mingos, Professor of Inorganic Chemistry
 2009–2018 Keith Gull, FRS
 2018–present Kathy Willis

Fellows

Gallery

References

Books

External links

 St Edmund Hall – official website
 St Edmund Hall JCR website
 St Edmund Hall MCR website
 St Edmund Hall Alternative Prospectus website
 Virtual tour  of St Edmund Hall

 
Colleges of the University of Oxford
Grade I listed buildings in Oxford
Grade I listed educational buildings
Educational institutions established in the 13th century
13th-century establishments in England
Buildings and structures of the University of Oxford